Santosh Ganguli (19 March 1911 – 26 December 1985) was an Indian cricket umpire. He stood in ten Test matches between 1956 and 1965.

Ganguli was also a first-class cricketer, playing eleven matches, six of them for Bengal in the Ranji Trophy.

See also
 List of Test cricket umpires

References

1911 births
1985 deaths
Cricketers from Kolkata
Indian Test cricket umpires
Indian cricketers
Bengal cricketers
Uttar Pradesh cricketers